Duy Tân hội (chữ Hán: 維新會, Association for Modernization, 1904-1912) was an anti-French and pro-independence society in Vietnam founded by Phan Bội Châu and Prince Cường Để. Gilbert Trần Chánh Chiêu was an agent of the Society. The group in a broader sense was also considered a Modernisation Movement (:vi:Phong trào Duy Tân).

References

Vietnamese independence movement
Phan Bội Châu